Henry Aldrich Gets Glamour is a 1943 American comedy film directed by Hugh Bennett and written by Edwin Blum and Aleen Leslie. The film stars Jimmy Lydon, Charles Smith, John Litel, Olive Blakeney, Diana Lynn and Frances Gifford. The film was released on April 30, 1943, by Paramount Pictures.

Plot

Henry Aldrich becomes the most sought after guy in town when he wins a date with a movie star.

Cast 
Jimmy Lydon as Henry Aldrich
Charles Smith as Dizzy Stevens
John Litel as Mr. Sam Aldrich
Olive Blakeney as Mrs. Aldrich
Diana Lynn as Phyllis Michael
Frances Gifford as Hilary Dane
Gail Russell as Virginia Lowry
Vaughan Glaser as Mr. Bradley
Anne Rooney as Evelyn

References

External links 
 

1943 films
American black-and-white films
Films scored by Robert Emmett Dolan
Paramount Pictures films
American comedy films
1943 comedy films
The Aldrich Family films
1940s English-language films
Films directed by Hugh Bennett
1940s American films